The 18619 / 20 Ranchi Junction–Godda Intercity Express is a Mail/Express train belonging to Indian Railways South Eastern Railway zone that runs between  and  in India.

Coaches
The 18619 / 20 Ranchi Junction–Dumka Intercity Express has one AC 3 Tier, four Sleeper Class, three general unreserved & two SLR (seating with luggage rake) coaches. It does not carry a pantry car.

As is customary with most train services in India, coach composition may be amended at the discretion of Indian Railways depending on demand.

The train has been allotted a 10-coach rake of ICF coach.

Service

Schedule

Running days : Daily from both the sides.

Routing

Traction
As the route is not fully electrified, a -based WDM-3A diesel locomotive pulls the train to Jasidih and from there it runs with a Howrah-based WAP- 4 electric locomotive pulls to its entire destination.

See also

References

External links

 Ministry of Railways. (Official site) 
18619 Intercity Express at India Rail Info
18620 Intercity Express at India Rail Info

|

Intercity Express (Indian Railways) trains
Transport in Ranchi
Rail transport in Jharkhand
Rail transport in West Bengal